Asialepidotus is an extinct genus of prehistoric bony fish that lived during the Middle Triassic epoch.

See also

 Prehistoric fish
 List of prehistoric bony fish

References

Halecomorphi
Middle Triassic fish
Prehistoric animals of China